tkdiff is a graphical diff viewer based on the Tk framework. It is capable of inter-operating with source-control systems like CVS and Subversion to show the differences between the local copy and the repository version.  Such a line-by-line comparison is often considered to be good software engineering practice before committing code changes.

Tkdiff highlight specific differences within a line shared by both files, rather than simply indicating that the whole line differs.

Example usage

 tkdiff <file1> <file2> — to compare the two files <file1> and  <file2>
 tkdiff <file>  — to compare the local version of the given file to the most recent version in the CVS/Subversion repository

tkdiff can also compare two older revisions of a file,  etc.

References

Free file comparison tools